Ernest Norman Johnson (May 9, 1915 – April 4, 2015) was an American politician in the state of North Dakota. He served in the North Dakota House of Representatives from 1959 to 1971, and as Speaker of the House in 1969. He died at the age of 99 in 2015.

References

1915 births
2015 deaths